Dahisar (station code: DIC) is a railway station on the Western line of the Mumbai Suburban Railway network. Dahisar station is the last station within the Brihanmumbai Municipal Corporation limits. The area around the station has heavy traffic and is congested.

With the construction of the railway line connecting Dahisar to the city of Mumbai in 1867, came the first lot of migrants, the people from Sindhudurg region of Konkan. These migrants established the first planned residential areas of Dahisar - Maratha Colony in Dahisar East and Mhatre Wadi in the West. The Railway authorities wanted to name the Railhead at Dahisar as Mount Poinsur, but the locals opposed this move and forced the authorities to name it as Dahisar. Currently, it has 4 platforms with 2 for Slow line (Up and Down) and 2 for fast line (Up and Down). All platforms can handle 15-coach Suburban trains.

The station was originally named Mount Poinsur, after the locality of the Our Lady of Immaculate Conception Church in Borivali. Due to demands from local residents who referred to the area as Dahisar, the Railways agreed to rename the station.

Connectivity

Dahisar East
Dahisar station mostly serves the areas of Ghartanpada, Rawalpada, Kokanipada, Ovaripada, Anand Nagar, Shailendra Nagar, Vaishali Nagar, Parbat Nagar, Dahisar Check Naka, Ketki pada etc. Auto Rikshaw services (individually and sharing both) are available to the above-mentioned areas. Since the road leading to Dahisar station is narrow, no buses directly ply till the entrance of Dahisar station. Only one bus route (route 696, towards Diamond Industries) had been started directly serving the railway station but discontinued due to low patronage. 

Bharucha road or a skywalk above it connects the station entrance to SV Road near Canara Bank (distance 360m) and from there, buses plying to Mira road (701,703,710), Bhayander (709,710), Dahisar Check Naka, Western Park Mira road (705), Borivali East, Kandivali East (701), Samta Nagar Kandivali (703), Goregaon Dindoshi (705), Bandra (225), Shivajinagar Mankhurd via Aarey Colony, Powai, Vikhroli, Ghatkopar (489) are available.

Dahisar West
LT road runs parallel to railway line and also immediately outside station entrance. It mostly serves the areas of Dahisar Bridge, Kandarpada, Nava gaon, St. Francis school etc. Skywalk connects the areas of Gomant Nagar/Dahisar Phatak and Dahisar Bridge. Buses are available to Borivali Station West (205,208), Jogeshwari West (205), Dahisar Bridge (204) and Saraswati complex/Anand Nagar Dahisar East (208).

References

Railway stations in Mumbai Suburban district
Mumbai Suburban Railway stations
Mumbai WR railway division